Hanna Kristina Hedlund (born 24 January 1975, Kilafors, Bollnäs Municipality, Sweden) is a Swedish singer. Her sister Lina is also a singer. She has a son and a daughter with Martin Stenmarck.

Career
Hedlund competed in Melodifestivalen 2000 with the song "Anropar försvunnen" and finished in eighth place. She also competed with her sister Lina in Melodifestivalen 2002 with the song "Big Time Party"  and finished in ninth place.

Hedlund was a judge of the TV4 show Talang 2007, the Swedish version of Britain's Got Talent, with Bert Karlsson and Tobbe Blom.

Hedlund currently hosts the singing competition Singing Bee on TV3 in Sweden. In 2009, she participated in the Swedish version of Clash of the choirs with a choir from her hometown Bollnäs, and won the final against Erik Segerstedt.

Discography

Singles

References

External links

Hanna Hedlund

1975 births
Living people
People from Bollnäs Municipality
21st-century Swedish singers
21st-century Swedish women singers
Melodifestivalen contestants of 2013
Melodifestivalen contestants of 2002
Melodifestivalen contestants of 2000